Jaroš (Czech/Slovak feminine: Jarošová) is a surname. Related surnames include Jaros, Jarosz, Jarosch, and Yarosh. Notable people with the surname include:

Christián Jaroš (born 1996), Slovak ice hockey player
Hana Jarošová (born 1949), Czech basketball player
Jan Jaroš (born 1984), Czech speedway rider
Otakar Jaroš (1912–1943), Czech officer
Peter Jaroš (born 1940), Slovak writer
Radek Jaroš (born 1964), Czech mountaineer
Vítězslav Jaroš (born 2001), Czech footballer

See also
 

Czech-language surnames
Slovak-language surnames